Paul Elmer Violette (born 1955) was an American politician from Maine. Violette, a Democrat, served in the Maine House of Representatives from 1978 to 1980 and in the Maine Senate from 1981 to 1986. During his final term (1985–1986), Violette was the Senate Majority Leader.  He was a resident of Van Buren, Maine. He was later sent to prison for embezzling $430,000 while leading the Maine Turnpike Authority in what prosecutors described as one of the most egregious cases of corruption in Maine history.

His father, Elmer H. Violette and grandfather, Vital E. Violette, both served in the Maine House of Representatives.

References

1955 births
Living people
People from Van Buren, Maine
Democratic Party members of the Maine House of Representatives
Majority leaders of the Maine Senate